Krẽje or Kreye is an extinct Jê language that was spoken in Maranhão and Pará, Brazil.

References

Jê languages